Paul Sobiechowski (born October 31, 1954) is bishop of the Eastern Diocese of Polish National Catholic Church. He was born in Detroit, Michigan and ordained to the priesthood in 1979 after studies at Savonarola Theological Seminary; he was consecrated to the episcopate on October 18, 2011.

External links
Appointment of a reluctant bishop

21st-century American bishops
American Polish National Catholics
Bishops of the Polish National Catholic Church
American people of Polish descent
1954 births
Living people
Clergy from Detroit